The 1984 African Championships in Athletics were held in Rabat, Morocco from August 12 to August 15, 1984 in the Prince Moulay Abdellah Stadium.

Medal summary

Men's events

Women's events

Medal table

See also
 1984 in athletics (track and field)

External links
Results – GBR Athletics

A
African Championships in Athletics
International athletics competitions hosted by Morocco
African Championships in Athletics
Sport in Rabat
1984 in Moroccan sport